The Winter Park Library is a nonprofit lending library located in Winter Park, Florida. The library's core mission is education.

History

The library dates back to 1885, when nine women organized to create a lending library for Winter Park. Books had previously been circulated in an organized reading circle, but a library didn't exist within the small community. The village of Winter Park was still in its infancy at this time, less than five years old, but both the incorporation of a railroad and the inaugural classes beginning at Rollins College in 1885 influenced the town's image as a desirable place to live. Intent on creating a lending library for the community, this ambitious group of women held a meeting at the Congregational Parsonage, which is now the location of the current Rollins campus, roughly where the Archibald Granville Bush Science Center sits today.

This was a time of male-only suffrage, and women had to content themselves with more “ladylike” pursuits, such as ministering to the needy and coming up with ideas for civic projects. All elected officers of the circulating library, however, would be women. The president was Mrs. Elizabeth P. Hooker, the wife of a doctor and Congregational minister, as well as a president of Rollins College. She was raised by a professor at Middlebury College, where she received some advanced education and was likely familiar with the workings of a college library. The “two Marys” in the group, Mary McClure and Mary E. Brown, were both retired teachers. Brown would be remembered as being "of a singularly acute and independent mind, a lover of the best books, a keen critic, and an unfailing source of intellectual stimulus to all who knew her.” Alice Guild and her sister, Clara, came from Boston with their father in 1883. Alice, 25 at the time, was elected as fundraiser for the library, while her sister, Clara, albeit not one of the library's noted founders, was in her own right a member of the first class at Rollins and later received the college's first degree conferred upon a woman. Evaline Lamson was only 30 when she became the driving force behind the library's survival and for several years served simultaneously as librarian for the town library and the one at Rollins College. Little is known about the remaining members, Mrs. C. J. Ladd, Mrs. Clark, Mrs. Cook, and Mrs. W. O. Cady, except that the latter would become the first librarian for the Winter Park Circulating Library.

While deliberating and discussing details, the most crucial decision for the women was not how to get the necessary books, as they had been circulating books among themselves for some time, but where to base their new venture. The first site was the Lamson house at 503 Interlachen Avenue, and initially operating only on Wednesdays and Saturdays. Records for the year of 1887 gave some insight into what was being read that year, including The Scarlet Letter, The Last Days of Pompeii, Jane Eyre, Ivanhoe, and The Rise of Silas Lapham. Biographies were also popular, such as those on Frederick the Great, and religious titles, The Blood of Jesus, Thoughts on Personal Religion, and Scientific Theism. Since the library shelves and inventory were limited, the rules for borrowing material were that members could take out one book on Wednesday and Saturday and keep it for two weeks, with a one-week renewal. They would impose a 10-cent fine for non-renewals, and those who were not members would be allowed to take out books if they paid a $1 deposit plus 10 cents for each week.

One year after the library's founding, as recorded in the minutes of the annual meeting held on December 16, 1886, the officers accepted an offer to move its operations from Miss Lamson's porch to a room in a building occupied by the Winter Park Company on the southwest corner of New England and Park Avenues. The Winter Park Circulating Library Association wrote its constitution in 1888.

Economic devastation would bring the library to the brink of closure in 1895. As it is today, Florida's two biggest commodities are citrus and tourism. Winter Park relied on winter visitors, but according to The History of Orlando by Eve Bacon, “the temperature dropped to 24 degrees the Sunday after Christmas Day in 1894,” and dropped even lower to an astounding 17 degrees in February. This hard freeze killed trees and citrus, and potential visitors to the area, hearing news of the record cold, decided not to visit. The blow to the area's economy was evident in the library's December 1895 annual meeting, where the treasurer's report revealed an existing balance of $8.60. In spite of this drop in profit, the overall bleak outlook of the time gave an unexpected boost in inventory, which may have been gifted books by families moving from the area. The population of Winter Park would fluctuate dramatically from the end of the nineteenth century to the beginning of the twentieth, but the welcome addition of some wealthy new residents would bring relief via donations, which enabled the library to buy more books in 1896.

In 1900, discussion of what should be included in a new, permanent building effectively set the library's policy for years to come, as the decision was made to include a children's department. The Winter Park Circulating Library Association's president, Eleanora Comstock, called a meeting to propose plans and start fundraising efforts. Pledges of $1,216 were received by February 1901, and land was donated by the estate of Francis Knowles. The library opened in April 1902. This also expanded hours of operation to every day. Fundraising consisted of outreach to the public and a financial commitment from the city government, which continues to this day.

Indoor plumbing was not part of the original design of the new building in 1900, and in the absence of modern insulation, complaints about heat in the summer and cold in the winter are recorded aspects of its history.

Prosperity inevitably came back to the area due in part to both a revitalized citrus industry and the construction of the new Seminole Hotel in 1912 following a fire that had burned down the prior building, and had long been a great source of revenue for the library. Also, the town council agreed to provide free electricity to the library building in 1914. In light of these developments and donations, the library added a kitchen wing that same year, which inspired the ladies of the library to continue a series of teas, fundraising socials and other events of interest to potential patrons. The library would eventually double in size in 1924 when they added two new wings and a lavatory. And by 1945, the library had a collection of 12,269 books and a circulation of 33,214.

Despite the historical and commendable efforts behind the library's origin and contribution to the community of Winter Park during this time, it had remained somewhat of an exclusive group of patrons that many residents chose not to join. Furthermore, the library only served the white townspeople. A separate library was founded in the heart of the black residential community in mid-1937. Founded by Dr. Edwin O. Grover in 1937, the Hannibal Square Library was established for African American residents, dedicated in memory of his wife, who had been an activist in the cause of education and the black community. Initially functioning as an independent library, it began receiving regular appropriations from the city in the 1950s, albeit on a smaller scale than that received by the Winter Park Library. A children's room was added in 1955. A popular place for children and local organizations to meet, neighbors maintained the grounds, donated to the organization, and planted shrubbery and flowers to beautify it. The Board of Directors was composed of black and white residents. It was also around this time that the word "Public" was added to the title of "Winter Park Public Library" to reflect this change. The Winter Park Public Library integrated in 1962 and 1963, adopting a policy of library service to all residents of Winter Park, irrespective of age, race, creed, color or financial situation.  In 1979, the Hannibal Square Library was closed due to decline in circulation and the building and grounds were returned to the city's council.

Although it was initially proposed to simply build on to the existing library site, the issue of insufficient parking was the inspiration for constructing a new building on a different site. In September 1976, the city bought some land at 460 East New England Avenue, and in July 1977, the Library received a grant for construction on the site. Soon thereafter, the Winter Park Public Library opened with nearly twice the square footage and increased parking spaces from thirteen to sixty-five. The facility was expanded starting in 1994, adding a third floor to allow more space for services to patrons aged 12 to 18.

Again, a lack of space led to the 2016 initiative to create a new library building. In March 2016, voters passed an issuance of a $30 million bond referendum to finance the cost to construct this new facility. However, a public opposition group delayed the process for several years. In 2019, the area was temporarily renamed to 'the Canopy', a massive campus in Winter Park with a 35,690-square-foot library and a 13,456-square-foot events center is set to open in May 2021. Set within the 23-acre block that includes Martin Luther King, Jr. Park, the Winter Park Canopy was proposed to offer views of the water’s edge and natural surroundings, 230-plus parking spaces, and an outdoor amphitheatre. Community efforts continued to fund additional amenities, including a porte cochère, rooftop venue, indoor raked auditorium and additional project enhancement opportunities. The campus was renamed to the Winter Park Library and Events Center and opened at the new location in December 2021. The library's website describes the new offerings that are now available to patrons in the new location, including a library commons area, an education and performance space, three collaborative and working rooms, a business center, social spaces near age-appropriate book collections, a computer lab, private study rooms, a "Dream Room Lab" with 3D printers, a studio with video and audio production, and a larger story room adjacent.

Services, Programs & Classes

All available "circulating collection" items and materials may be checked out from the Winter Park Library, including books, DVDs, CDs, audiobooks, video games, software, tablet computers, mobile hotspots, computer keyboards and bicycles. Checkout periods vary depending on the type of materials. Currently, books, audiobooks, E-books, and E-audiobooks may be checked out for three weeks. DVDs, video games, software, tablets, and mobile hotspots are available to check out for one week. Bicycles are available to borrow during set hours according to the season.

It has claimed itself to be a “21st century library,” with a variety of programs, classes, and services available to the community, including meeting rooms for rent, voter registration, and fully equipped computers for library cardholders to use. The sale of boat decals are available for those who own a motorboat, allowing access to the Winter Park Chain of Lakes. The library also serves as an early voting polling place for the Orange County, Florida Supervisor of Elections . Their New Leaf Bookstore is located on the first floor. And the library's makerspace, the Genius Lab, offers patrons the ability to create a variety of content, including 3D models, videos, audio recordings, and graphics.

Classes are available to cardholders, including language development, kids’ programs, tutoring, storytelling and entertainment, writing workshops, book clubs, financial education, web content creation, and coding. Youth programs include the Angel Paws to Read, which offers students age 5+ the opportunity to read to therapy and service dogs in an effort to earn “paw stamps” towards free books and T-shirts, and Wobbly Walkers for ages 13–24 months, which features activities and storytime.

Special Collections

The core of the Winter Park Library Archives and Special Collections  was established through the generosity of local historian and businesswoman, Eve Bacon. In 1976, Bacon donated her numerous files of Winter Park information to the Winter Park Public Library and set into motion the active acquisition and preservation of materials pertaining to the city of Winter Park and its residents. The collection continues to grow through the library's own acquisition efforts and the generous donations from members of the community. In the pursuit of preserving Winter Park's history, the collection includes maps, photographs, newspaper clippings, periodicals, scrapbooks, city government records, books, pamphlets, and correspondence.
The Winter Park Library Archives and Special Collections act as a depository for the DAR Scrapbooks documenting the activities of the William Pope Duval Chapter of the Daughters of the American Revolution, established May 15, 1957. The scrapbooks date from the 1970s to the mid-1990s. The Winter Park Public Library accepted all of the chapter's scrapbooks for their living history section.
In celebration of the city's inaugural "Weekend of the Arts" Celebration, Winter Park Sidewalk Art Festival's “Best of Show” Collection features art and scrapbooks compiled by the Winter Park Sidewalk Art Festival. Showcased in many areas of the library and event center, this collection documents the annual event, which began in 1961. They are available for public use, but it is necessary to make prior arrangements with the Winter Park History and Archives Collection archivist.
Digital collections are also available through the Winter Park Library Archives and Special Collections. This extensive collection includes historical information about individuals and families from Winter Park; notable homes, businesses, parks, and other locations; events such as festivals, celebrations and activities; as well as information about clubs, organizations, publications, and other miscellaneous subjects.

Reciprocity with the Orange County Library System
Because the Winter Park Library is partially owned, operated and funded by the city's taxpayers and is not part of the county operated by Orange County Library System (OCLS), residents of Winter Park are not automatically given privileges or access to the OCLS branches or services; instead, an agreement was reached between the city and the OCLS whereas a city resident can go to any OCLS branch and request a "Reciprocal borrower card" which is provided free of charge. The Reciprocal borrower cards is valid for one year and can be used at any OCLS branch with the exception of the Melrose Center at the Orlando Public Library which requires a separate Melrose Center specific card which is issued after the user applies for the card and goes through a mandatory orientation class. Access to the OCLS Internet on library owned PCs requires a Reciprocal borrower to pay small session access fee. The OCLS Wi-Fi network which is available at all branches remains free of charge to all users including Reciprocal borrowers and visitors who use their devices.

External links
 The Winter Park Library
 Aspen Institute Dialogue on Public Libraries 
 Winter Park Sidewalk Art Festival

References

Public libraries in Florida
Buildings and structures in Winter Park, Florida
1976 establishments in Florida
Archives in the United States